The aviation is a cocktail made with gin, maraschino liqueur, crème de violette and lemon juice. Some recipes omit the crème de violette. It is served straight up, in a cocktail glass.

History
The aviation was created by Hugo Ensslin, head bartender at the Hotel Wallick in New York, in the early twentieth century. The first published recipe appeared in Ensslin's 1916 Recipes for Mixed Drinks. Ensslin's recipe called for 1½ oz. El Bart gin, ¾ oz. lemon juice, 2 dashes maraschino liqueur, and 2 dashes crème de violette, a violet liqueur which gives the cocktail a pale purple color.

Harry Craddock's influential Savoy Cocktail Book (1930) omitted the crème de violette, calling for a mixture of two thirds dry gin, one third lemon juice and two dashes of maraschino. Many later bartenders have followed Craddock's lead, leaving out the difficult-to-find violet liqueur.

Creme Yvette, a violet liqueur made with additional spices, is sometimes substituted for crème de violette.

Related cocktails
 The aviation can be considered a variation on the Gin sour, using maraschino as its sweetener.
 The Blue Moon cocktail is made with gin, lemon juice, and crème de violette or Creme Yvette, without maraschino.
 The Moonlight cocktail is made with gin, lime juice, Cointreau, and crème de violette.
 Takumi's aviation is made with gin, maraschino liqueur, parfait d'amour, and lemon juice. The drink was created by the Japanese bartender Takumi Watanabe. It was recorded in Gary Regan's The Joy of Mixology (2017).

See also

 List of cocktails
 List of cocktails (alphabetical)
 List of IBA official cocktails
 El-Bart Gin (Camberwell Distillery) Company Ltd #13413267

References

Cocktails with gin
Cocktails with liqueur
Cocktails with crème de violette